San Vito al Tagliamento is a comune (municipality) in the Province of Pordenone in the Italian region Friuli Venezia Giulia, located about  northwest of Trieste and about  southeast of Pordenone.

Main sights

It is a medieval town on the right bank of the Tagliamento river.

The main attractions are:
Three towers of the old medieval walls, one of which houses a small archaeological museum
Church of San Lorenzo (1479)
Church of Santa Maria dei Battuti, housing works by Pomponio Amalteo and Giovanni Antonio Pilacorte. 
Palazzo Rota, now Town Hall
The Duomo (Cathedral), with a triptych by Andrea Bellunello and works by Amalteo, Gaspare Diziani and Padovanino.

Twin towns
San Vito al Tagliamento is twinned with:

  Rixheim, France
  Stadtlohn, Germany
  Nagyatád, Hungary
  Sankt Veit an der Glan, Austria

People
  (San Vito al Tagliamento, end of 14th century – 1450), bishop and papal envoy.
 Pomponio Amalteo Motta di Livenza, 1505 – San Vito al Tagliamento, 1588), painter.
 Paolo Sarpi (Venice, 1552 – 1623), religious, theologian, historian and scientist hailing from San Vito.
  (San Vito al Tagliamento, 1687 – 1764), religious and naturalist.
  (San Vito al Tagliamento, 1841 – 1920), soldier in Garibaldi's army.
 Zefferino Tomè (1905-1979), politician, Senator of the Republic and former city mayor.
  (San Vito al Tagliamento, 1872 – 1945), cofounder Lancia company.
  (San Vito al Tagliamento, 1876 – Padua, 1954), entrepreneur and philanthropist, a prominent member of the Morassutti family.
 Arnaldo Mussolini (Dovia di Predappio, 1885 – Milan, 1931), reporter and politician, Benito Mussolini's brother. He was a teacher in San Vito.
 Riccardo Cassin (San Vito al Tagliamento, 1909 – Pian dei Resinelli, 2009), mountaineer.
  (San Vito al Tagliamento, 1912 – 1963), reporter and Italian politician, Benito Mussolini's Nephew.
 Carlo Tullio Altan (San Vito al Tagliamento, 1916 – Palmanova, 2005), anthropologist, sociologist and philosopher.
  (San Vito al Tagliamento, 1916 – Trieste, 2012), tennis player.
 Franco Castellano (San Vito al Tagliamento, 1957), actor.
 Andrea Cessel (San Vito al Tagliamento, 1969), basketball player.
 Filippo Cristante (San Vito al Tagliamento, 1977), soccer player.
 Bryan Cristante (San Vito al Tagliamento, 1995), soccer player.
 Massimo Donati (San Vito al Tagliamento, 1981), soccer player.
 Melissa Comin De Candido (San Vito al Tagliamento, 1983), figure roller skater.
  (unknown – unknown), agronomist.
  (San Vito al Tagliamento, 1955), politician, Senathor of the Republic since 2006.
  (San Vito al Tagliamento, 1976), film director, Marc'Aurelio d'oro winner at Festival del cinema di Roma 2013 edition.
 Alessandro Comodin (San Vito al Tagliamento, 1982), film director, screenwriter, photographer, film editor.

Curiosity 

 Benito Mussolini's brother taught in San Vito al Tagliamento for several years. First at Gleris and later at Falcon-Vial's institute.
 In San Vito al Tagliamento, it is possible to find the miraculous painting about "Madonna di Rosa" crowned by Pope Leo XIII "Queen and protectress of Tagliamento and his inhabitants".
 In the yard in front of Ligugnana's church there is the sculpture of Saint Lawrence, sculpted by Pierino Sam (1921-2010).

Gallery

References

External links
 
 Page on the website for the development of tourism in the Friuli Venezia Giulia region